The Men's time trial track cycling events at the 2012 Summer Paralympics took place on August 30–September 1 at London Velopark.

Classification
Cyclists are given a classification depending on the type and extent of their disability. The classification system allows cyclists to compete against others with a similar level of function. The class number indicates the severity of impairment with "1" being most impaired.

Track cycling classes are:
B: Blind and visually impaired cyclists use a Tandem bicycle with a sighted pilot on the front
C 1-5: Cyclists with an impairment that affects their legs, arms or trunk but are capable of using a standard bicycle

B

The men's 1 km time trial (C1-3) took place on August 30.

WR = World Record; DNF = Did Not Finish.

C1-3

The men's 1 km time trial (C1-3) took place on August 30.

C4-5

The men's 1 km time trial (C4-5) took place on August 31.

References 

Men's time trial